Geoffrey MacLaren (28 February 1883 – 14 September 1966) was an English cricketer who played first-class cricket for Lancashire in addition to playing three matches for Egypt. His elder brothers Archie and James also played for Lancashire, as did his uncle Alexander Rowley. Archie also played Test cricket for England.

Biography

Born in Whalley Range, Manchester in 1883, Geoffrey MacLaren was educated at Harrow. He played his only two first-class matches for Lancashire during the 1902 English cricket season, both under the captaincy of elder brother Archie.

He later lived in Egypt for a time, playing for Cairo against I Zingari in March 1914, followed by three matches for the Egyptian national side against the same opposition. He died in Sussex in 1966.

References

1883 births
1966 deaths
People educated at Harrow School
People from Whalley Range
Egyptian cricketers
English cricketers
Lancashire cricketers
British expatriates in Egypt